Dr. Sheila Ann Hudson (born June 30, 1967) is an American former track and field athlete and Olympian, ranked among the all-time greatest U.S. competitors in the women's triple jump.  Throughout her career, she won nine U.S. triple jump titles, and set two world bests (World records before the event became an IAAF record event) and nine American records.  She previously held the indoor American record in the women's triple jump (46-8.25) as well as the outdoor American record in women's triple jump (47-3.5) with a wind aided all-time best jump of 48-1.25.  Hudson won the silver medal at the 1994 IAAF World Cup, finished eighth at the 1995 World Indoor Championships, tenth at the 1996 Olympic Games and fifth at the 1998 IAAF World Cup. 
 
Hudson was a pioneer and advocate in the fight to make the triple jump an Olympic event for women.  She represented the United States and placed 10th in the inaugural Olympic women's triple jump competition in the 1996 Atlanta Games.

Following her competitive track and field career, Hudson earned a doctoral degree in Educational Leadership.  She has worked as a staff writer for the Sacramento Bee, and as a collegiate coach and athletics administrator.

Hudson is active in championing women's rights and empowering women and girls in sports. She is a member of Women Leaders in College Sports and the American Association of University Women.  Hudson previously served on the NCAA Track and Field Committee, as well as the Board of Directors and the Athletes Advisory Committee for USA Track & Field (USATF).

Early years

Born in Würzburg, Germany, Hudson attended Rio Linda High School in Rio Linda, California, where she competed in track and field and played on the girls’ basketball team.  Hudson was the Knights’ starting point guard and played on the varsity basketball team all four years during high school.  On the track, Hudson competed in the triple jump, long jump, 300-meter hurdles and the 4 × 100 m and 4 × 400 m relays.  Hudson captured the 1985 CIF California State Meet title in the triple jump during her senior year and accepted a full track scholarship to attend UC Berkeley.

UC Berkeley 
Hudson attended college at the University of California at Berkeley, where she earned a bachelor's degree in architecture in 1990. She was also recruited by Stanford University, but chose Cal because of its reputation for liberal ideas and social and political activism.

College Track & Field career

Hudson competed for the Cal track and field team from 1986 to 1990.  While at Cal, Hudson was a nine-time All-American and earned six NCAA Division I National Championships – four in the triple jump and two in the long Jump.  She holds school records in the triple jump (46-0.75) and long jump (22-1).  Hudson was voted Cal's Pac-10 Athlete of the Decade for track and field (1986–96).

Career at UC Berkeley

Post-collegiate career

Olympic women’s triple jump advocacy

Hudson spent many years as one of the primary athletes advocating for the inclusion of the women's triple Jump in the Olympics.  After years of lobbying, the International Olympic Committee added the event to the 1996 Olympic Games.  Hudson placed 10th for the United States in the inaugural women's triple jump competition in the 1996 Atlanta Olympics.

National and international competition

In U.S. Championship competition, Hudson is a four-time USA Outdoor triple jump champion (1989, ’90, ’94 and ’95) and a five-time USA Indoor triple jump champion (1990, ’93, ’94, ’95 and ’96).  Hudson held the Indoor American triple jump record (46-8.25) for twenty-three years, relinquishing the record in 2017.  Sheila set and broke her own Outdoor American triple jump record numerous times between 1987 and 1995, holding the Outdoor American record for seventeen years until it was broken in 2004.  
Internationally, Hudson won the silver medal at the 1994 IAAF World Cup, won the bronze medal at the 1993 Goodwill Games, finished eighth at the 1995 World Indoor Championships, tenth at the 1996 Olympic Games and fifth at the 1998 IAAF World Cup.

USA National Championships

Honors and awards

 Pac-12 All-Century Team for track and field (2016)
 Pac-10 Athlete of the Decade for track and field (1986–96)
 Honda Sports Award nominee (1989–90)
 Pac-12 Silver Anniversary Team for track and field (2006)
 UC Berkeley Hall of Fame inductee (1999)
 CIF Sac-Joaquin Section Hall of Fame inductee (2014)

Post-competitive career

Sports journalism career

At the close of her professional track and field career, Hudson began working in her hometown for the Sacramento Bee newspaper, beginning with an Olympic hopeful diary. She later focused on feature articles as a staff writer in The Bee's sports department from 2000-02.

Coaching career

Hudson served as an assistant track and field coach at her alma mater, UC Berkeley, from 1992-94. She later served as an assistant track coach at California State University, Los Angeles, from 2002-08. Hudson's tutelage contributed to the following achievements among Cal State LA's jumpers:

 1 NCAA Division II individual National Champion (triple jump)
 4 NCAA Division II National Championship Runners Up (triple jump, long jump, high jump)
 18 NCAA Division II All-Americans
 12 CCAA individual Conference Champions
 36 CCAA individual All-Conference Honorees

Athletics administration career

In 2008, while at Cal State LA, Hudson fully transitioned from collegiate coaching to athletics administration. She served as Cal State LA's Compliance Coordinator and Senior Woman Administrator for two years before being promoted to Associate Athletics Director in 2008. Hudson earned a promotion to Senior Associate Director of Athletics in January 2016 and concurrently served as a campus Deputy Title IX Coordinator. Hudson departed Cal State LA in 2017.

Education

Hudson was the first in her family's history to attend a university. She earned a B.A. in architecture from UC Berkeley in 1990. While working full-time as an athletics administrator, Hudson pursued graduate study at Cal State LA, earning an M.A. in Teaching English to Speakers of Other Languages and a Doctorate in Educational Leadership.

Authored articles and publications (section under construction)

References

External links

1967 births
Living people
People from Kitzingen
Sportspeople from Lower Franconia
Track and field athletes from California
American female triple jumpers
African-American female track and field athletes
Olympic track and field athletes of the United States
Athletes (track and field) at the 1996 Summer Olympics
American sportspeople of Korean descent
Goodwill Games medalists in athletics
Competitors at the 1994 Goodwill Games
21st-century African-American people
21st-century African-American women
20th-century African-American sportspeople
20th-century African-American women